Runtole is a settlement in the City Municipality of Celje in eastern Slovenia. It lies in the hills north of Celje, next to Lake Šmartno. The area is part of the traditional region of Styria. It is now included with the rest of the municipality in the Savinja Statistical Region.

Name
Runtole was attested in historical sources as Landoll in 1458 (and as Londol in 1464); compare Landol. The Slovene name is an archaic locative form of the German compound Rundtal 'rounded valley', referring to the local geography.

References

External links
Runtole on Geopedia

Populated places in the City Municipality of Celje